White Dress may refer to:

 "White Dress", a song by French Montana from the 2017 album Jungle Rules
 "White Dress", a song by Kanye West from the 2012 soundtrack The Man with the Iron Fists (soundtrack)
 "White Dress", a song by Lana Del Rey from the 2021 album Chemtrails over the Country Club
 "White Dress", a 2015 song by Set Mo and Deutsche Duke

Other uses
 The White Dress, a 1945 murder mystery novel by Mignon G. Eberhart
 White dress of Marilyn Monroe, a dress worn by Marilyn Monroe in The Seven Year Itch

See also